Chon Un-ju (born on 8 April 1970) is a North Korean sport shooter. She competed in rifle shooting events at the 1992 Summer Olympics.

Olympic results

References

External links
 ISSF Profile

1970 births
Living people
ISSF rifle shooters
North Korean female sport shooters
Shooters at the 1992 Summer Olympics
Olympic shooters of North Korea
Shooters at the 1990 Asian Games
Asian Games medalists in shooting
Asian Games gold medalists for North Korea
Asian Games bronze medalists for North Korea
Medalists at the 1990 Asian Games
20th-century North Korean women